(released as Kirby's Adventure Wii in PAL regions) is a 2011 platform video game developed by HAL Laboratory and published by Nintendo for the Wii. It is the ninth mainline installment and the twenty-second game in the Kirby series. While Kirby's Epic Yarn was released in 2010, Kirby's Return to Dream Land is the first traditional Kirby platforming home console game since Kirby 64: The Crystal Shards, which was released in 2000 for the Nintendo 64. The title was released in North America on October 24, 2011, in Japan on October 27, 2011, in Europe on November 25, 2011, and in Australia on December 1, 2011.

Kirby's Return to Dream Land features the staple gameplay of traditional Kirby platform games, in which Kirby possesses the ability to inhale and copy enemies to gain a variety of attacks such as breathing fire or swinging a sword. The game supports cooperative multiplayer gameplay, allowing up to four players to control various Kirby characters, including Bandana Waddle Dee, King Dedede, and Meta Knight. Kirbys plot focuses on the characters retrieving the scattered pieces of a crashed alien spaceship.

The game was announced as a GameCube title to be released in late 2005, but development was later shifted to its successor console, the Wii. The game was presumed to be canceled until it was re-announced in 2011. The game was made available on the Wii U's Nintendo eShop in 2015.

Some elements from the cancelled Kirby title of 2005 were carried over to Kirby's Return to Dream Land, such as the ability for players to stack up in a totem carried by the player on the bottom of the stack. Other elements from the Kirby title of 2005, such as Kirby's ability to befriend up to three "Helpers" (a gameplay mechanic from Kirby Super Star), were modified and carried over to another Kirby game, released in early 2018 on the Nintendo Switch, called Kirby Star Allies. Kirby's Return to Dream Land received generally positive reviews, with praise for the return to form of the traditional Kirby series gameplay, level design, visuals, and graphics, but criticism for its low difficulty and multiplayer. A remake for the Nintendo Switch,  was released on February 24, 2023.

Gameplay
Return to Dream Land is a 2.5D side-scrolling platform game, controlled by holding the Wii Remote sideways. Unlike previous entries in the Kirby series, the game features 3D models for player characters and enemies rather than sprites.

Throughout the game, Kirby can collect items which will heal him; food items that recover health, items that give him an extra life, or by collecting 100 stars, which immediately grants him an extra life. There are also various items Kirby can use to interact with the environment. At the end of each stage, a bonus game is played in which players time a button press to jump as high as possible to earn additional items.

The player controls Kirby, who retains his signature ability to inhale objects and enemies. The inhaled objects can either be swallowed, or propelled back out as a projectile. Kirby can also do a "Super Inhale", where shaking the Wii Remote or inhaling for a long time makes Kirby's inhale stronger. A Super Inhale has extended range and can suck up "Heave-ho Blocks", which are immovable from a regular inhale; the Super Inhale also allows Kirby to inhale other players and most large enemies.

Certain enemies, when swallowed, give Kirby access to a wide variety of "Copy Abilities", which gives Kirby the attack properties of the enemies he inhales. Kirby can only possess one copy ability at a time. Other players playing as another character through multiplayer, or those playing as King Dedede, Meta Knight, or Waddle Dee, can hold onto a Copy Ability's essence and throw them back to Kirby to be inhaled. If a discarded ability from these characters is left untouched, it will vanish shortly afterward.

Each copy ability has multiple attacks that are utilized depending on the combination of button-inputs pressed by the player. New abilities introduced in this game are the Whip ability, which lets Kirby grab out-of-reach items, the Water ability, which allows Kirby to extinguish fires, and the Leaf ability, which lets Kirby use leaves as a form of attack and conjure a pile of leaves to hide in and become invulnerable to nearly all attacks. The remake introduces both the Mecha ability, which gives Kirby laser cannons and robotic arms, and the Sand ability, which allows Kirby to morph sand into various shapes, as well as reintroducing the Festival ability from Kirby Star Allies.

The game introduces more powerful, temporary Copy Abilities called "Super Abilities," which are able to destroy parts of the environment and inflict tremendous damage across a wide range. Unlike regular Copy Abilities, ejecting a Super Ability will cause the Super Ability to be discarded instantly. Five Super Abilities exist: Ultra Sword, Monster Flame, Flare Beam, Grand Hammer, and Snow Bowl, which are enhanced versions of Sword, Fire, Beam, Hammer, and Freeze Copy Abilities respectively.

The game features drop-in cooperative multiplayer for up to three additional players. These players can either play as a yellow, blue or green Kirby, or as one of three unique characters: Meta Knight, King Dedede, and Waddle Dee. Each of these characters possess traits from corresponding Copy Abilities based on the way each character moves and attacks, though only Kirbys are able to inhale enemies and use Copy Abilities. Players are able to ride on top of each other as a "totem", which, with perfect timing, allows the use of a charged attack, called the "Team Attack", driven by the player at the bottom. Players can also share recently ingested health-restoring items through a move called "Face-to-Face" (similar to regurgitation). Within the Epilogue introduced in the remake, Magolor becomes a playable character, having been stripped of his powers and forced to regain them. He is able to levitate for short periods and produce energy attacks at first, and gains more abilities when a player upgrades them. Players 2–4 people can play as various recolors of Magolor in this mode.

All players share from a pool of lives, with each player requiring one life to enter the game. If one of the three additional players loses a life, they can spend an extra life to rejoin the game. However, if player one dies, all players stop play and gameplay restarts from the last checkpoint.

Plot
A dimension-hopping spaceship called the Lor Starcutter suddenly flies out of a wormhole and crashes onto Kirby's home planet of Popstar. As Kirby, Meta Knight, King Dedede and Bandana Waddle Dee go to investigate, they meet an alien named Magolor, who discovers that the five vital pieces of his ship, along with 120 energy spheres, have been scattered across the planet. With Magolor offering them a trip to his homeworld of Halcandra should they help fix his ship, Kirby and his friends set off to recover the lost pieces.

After retrieving the main pieces, they travel to Halcandra, where they are attacked by a four-headed dragon named Landia. Magolor claims Landia is an evil beast that has taken over Halcandra and sends Kirby to defeat it. However, after Landia is defeated, Magolor reveals his true motive was to steal the Master Crown on its head and become all-powerful, with the intent of making the entire universe bow before him, beginning with Popstar. Teaming up with Landia, who has split into four individual dragons, Kirby and his friends confront Magolor in Another Dimension in a final battle and destroy the Master Crown, while Magolor is transported to another dimension. With the Master Crown shattered and Magolor defeated, Kirby and friends return to Popstar, after a close call escaping the now collapsing Another Dimension. The Landia dragons take the Lor Starcutter and return home. A non-canon Extra Mode, which replaces Magolor's final form with Magolor Soul, reveals that Magolor may have been used as a puppet by the Master Crown itself.

Kirby's Return to Dream Land Deluxe introduces a new game mode: Magolor Epilogue: The Interdimensional Traveler. It stars Magolor after his defeat at the hands of Kirby and his friends. Stranded in the unknown realm of Another Dimension and without most of his powers, Magolor sets out trying to reclaim them while also collecting fragments of a mysterious fruit called the Gem Apple. He eventually repairs the Gem Apple seed at the Ethereal Altar, but it is soon corrupted by the remnants of the Master Crown, becoming the Crowned Doomer. After its defeat, the Master Crown remnants combine with the Gem Apple, transforming into a massive tree-like being. Magolor fights the Master Crown, and eventually defeats it for good by infusing a sword with his magic to slice it in half. Magolor then leaves Another Dimension through a portal that opens up after the Master Crown is defeated. The credits sequence reveals that via the portal, Magolor ends up in the village of the Dream Kingdom, the parallel version of Dream Land which is located in an alternate universe, with the Gem Apple seed, now reduced to a sapling, being planted as the village's Gem Apple tree. Having now redeemed himself, Magolor takes up residence as the Dream Kingdom's shopkeeper, leading into the events of Team Kirby Clash Deluxe and Super Kirby Clash.

Development
Development on a new Kirby game for the GameCube began after the release of Kirby 64: The Crystal Shards for the Nintendo 64 in 2000. The game underwent an 11-year development period, in which three different proposed versions of the game were developed and scrapped. The first version was similar to the graphical and gameplay style of Kirby 64, rendered in 3D, but using traditional 2D side-scrolling gameplay. The game would also support multiplayer with up to four players. This build was demonstrated at E3 in 2005, and was set for release later that year. However, difficulty with programming multiplayer led to this version being scrapped, though its concept would later resurface as Kirby Star Allies for the Nintendo Switch. The second build placed Kirby in a 3D environment with open world-style gameplay, and the third build returned to side-scrolling gameplay, but had the graphical style of a pop-up book similar to Yoshi's Story for the Nintendo 64 in the late 1990s. Although the second build was cancelled because it didn't achieve HAL Laboratory's quality standards, its concept would eventually resurface as Kirby and the Forgotten Land for the Nintendo Switch with elements from 2D platform games. The development team realized that the failure of the first three attempts were caused by too much focus on multiplayer, so focus was shifted to the single-player experience. Development of the final version accelerated in October 2010, when the game began to take form.

Kirbys long development caused the game to frequently appear and then disappear from Nintendo's upcoming game lists. On September 14, 2006, the Kirby game appeared on a list of upcoming Wii games, named , set for release in Japan. The December 2006 issue of Nintendo Power removed Kirby from its list of GameCube releases, but did not place it on its list of Wii releases. Matt Casamassina of IGN, posting on his blog, furthered the idea of a Wii release by stating that it would indeed be released for the Wii in 2007. He compared it to Donkey Kong Barrel Blast, another game that was originally announced as a GameCube title, but eventually released on Wii. While the game did not appear at E3 2007, Beth Llewelyn of Nintendo of America confirmed the game "had not been abandoned." The December 2007 issue of Official Nintendo Magazine claimed that a Kirby game for Wii was not in development. On May 7, 2010, Nintendo confirmed that a Kirby Wii title was still in the making.

Nintendo announced the game Kirby's Epic Yarn at E3 2010, a separate title that was in development by Good-Feel. The 2005 Kirby game was presumed to have been canceled until a Financial Results Briefing on January 28, 2011 re-announced the game with a release date set within the same year. At E3 2011, the game was demonstrated in playable form under the tentative title Kirby Wii. The game was later renamed Kirby's Return to Dream Land in North America, Kirby's Adventure Wii in Europe and Australia, and Hoshi no Kirby Wii in Japan. The music is composed by Jun Ishikawa and Hirokazu Ando with a soundtrack called Kirby Wii Music Selection featuring 45 musical pieces from the game.

During the Nintendo Direct on September 13, 2022, a remake of the game was announced for the Nintendo Switch titled Kirby's Return to Dream Land Deluxe. Additions to the original include new Mecha and Sand Abilities, a comic book-esque graphical style, and all new sub-games. The game was released on February 24, 2023.

Reception

Kirby's Return to Dream Land received "generally favorable" reviews, based on review aggregator Metacritic. According to Nintendo, the game sold 1.31 million copies by the end of 2012.

Multiple critics appreciated the return of traditional Kirby gameplay, compared to unique content such as Kirby's Epic Yarn. The game was called nostalgic and reminiscent of previous games, with Jim Sterling of Destructoid describing the game as "refreshing" and stating that "Kirby doesn't need to innovate, he just needs to be fun; Return to Dream Land brings the fun in spades." The graphics and visuals were praised for being detailed and vibrant. GameSpot reviewer Nathan Meunier called the levels beautifully designed, appreciating each one's environment.

Complaints were raised of how the game lacked difficulty, mostly from the use of multiplayer. IGN stated that the game could appeal to a younger audience with a simple difficulty level.

Kirby's Return to Dream Land Deluxe also received "generally favorable" reviews according to Metacritic, scoring slightly higher than the original.

Notes

References

External links
 Official website
 Official website (Nintendo of America)
 Official website (Nintendo UK)

2011 video games
Cancelled GameCube games
Cooperative video games
HAL Laboratory games
Kirby (series) platform games
Side-scrolling video games
Video games developed in Japan
Video games with 2.5D graphics
Wii games
Wii games re-released on the Nintendo eShop
Multiplayer and single-player video games
Video games about alien visitations
Science fantasy video games
Vaporware video games
Video games about dragons
Video games about magic
Video games about shapeshifting
Video games scored by Hirokazu Ando
Video games scored by Jun Ishikawa
Nintendo Switch games